is a Japanese athlete specializing in the 400 metres. He competed at the 2009 World Championships without reaching the final. He won several medals at regional championships mostly in the relay.

His personal best in the event is 45.84 (2009, 2011).

Personal bests

Competition record

References

External links

Hideyuki Hirose at JAAF 
Hideyuki Hirose at Fujitsu Track & Field Team  (archived)
Hideyuki Hirose at TBS  (archived)

1989 births
Living people
Sportspeople from Saga Prefecture
Japanese male sprinters
World Athletics Championships athletes for Japan
Asian Games medalists in athletics (track and field)
Athletes (track and field) at the 2010 Asian Games
Universiade medalists in athletics (track and field)
Asian Games silver medalists for Japan
Medalists at the 2010 Asian Games
Universiade silver medalists for Japan
Universiade bronze medalists for Japan
Medalists at the 2009 Summer Universiade
Medalists at the 2011 Summer Universiade
21st-century Japanese people